Xanthopleura is a genus of moths in the subfamily Arctiinae.

Species
 Xanthopleura flavocincta Guérin-Meneville, 1843
 Xanthopleura perspicua Walker, 1856

Former species
 Xanthopleura trotschi Druce, 1884

References

Natural History Museum Lepidoptera generic names catalog

Arctiinae